Johannes Jacobus "Kodgee" Kotze (7 August 1879 – 7 July 1931) was a cricketer from Cape Colony who played in three Test matches from 1902 to 1907. He was considered one of the fastest bowlers of his period.

References

1879 births
1931 deaths
Cricketers from Cape Colony
London County cricketers